Toma Ivanov Karayovov was a Bulgarian diplomat and publicist.

Biography 
Toma Karayovov was born c. 1875 in Skopje, Ottoman Empire. He graduated from the Bulgarian Men's High School of Thessaloniki and Law at Sofia University. From 1897 to 1900 he was secretary of the Bulgarian commercial agencies in Bitola and Edirne, of the diplomatic agencies in Vienna (1904-1905) and Rome (1907-1908). After the Young Turk Revolution initiated the establishment of the Bulgarian Constitutional Clubs and its chairman. After the First World War he is foreign representative of Internal Macedonian Revolutionary Organization (IMRO), one of the founders of the Macedonian Scientific Institute and a full member.

Toma Karayovov died in 1950 in Sofia, Bulgaria.

References 
 Bulgarian Academy of Sciences, Institute for historical research - "The Balkan Wars 1912-1913 - Memory and history", Sofia, 2012, Marin Drinov Academic Publishing House, p. 424-439

1870s births
1950 deaths
Bulgarian diplomats
Diplomats from Skopje
Members of the Macedonian Scientific Institute
Macedonian Bulgarians
Bulgarian Men's High School of Thessaloniki alumni
People from the Ottoman Empire